The 1972–73 season was Blackpool F.C.'s 65th season (62nd consecutive) in the Football League. It was also the 75th anniversary season of their debut in the Football League. They competed in the 22-team Division Two, then the second tier of English football, finishing seventh.

Blackpool's third and final appearance in the Anglo-Italian Cup ended at the fourth-round stage.

Bob Stokoe resigned as manager in November, to take charge at Sunderland. He was succeeded by Harry Potts.

Alan Suddick was the club's top scorer, with thirteen goals (ten in the league, one in the FA Cup and two in the League Cup). Alan Ainscow was the joint-top scorer in the league.

Table

Notes

References

Blackpool F.C.
Blackpool F.C. seasons